The 1994 European Parliament election was the fourth European election to be held in the United Kingdom. It was held on Thursday 9 June, though, as usual, the ballots were not counted until the evening of Sunday 12 June. The electoral system was, for the final European election, first past the post in England, Scotland and Wales and single transferable vote in Northern Ireland. This was the first election with 87 MEPs, the European Parliamentary Elections Act 1993 having increased the number of seats for the UK from 81. For the first time, the UK did not have the lowest turnout in Europe. Turnout was lower in the Netherlands and Portugal.

This was the first European election contested by the recently formed UK Independence Party (UKIP), and the first European election in which the Liberal Democrats won seats. The Green Party lost more than three-quarters of the votes they secured in the previous election. The Conservatives lost 14 seats, taking their number of seats down to 18, which was 42 fewer seats than in the 1979 election, the year they defeated the Labour Party in the 1979 General Election. This reflected the general unpopularity of the Major government at the time.

Labour was under the interim leadership of Margaret Beckett following the sudden death of leader John Smith the previous month.

Results

United Kingdom

Sources:

United Kingdom election results 

Total votes cast – 15,852,589.  All parties shown.

Great Britain

Sources:

United Kingdom election results 

Total votes cast – 15,292,722.  All parties shown.

Northern Ireland

Note 1: Campion's candidacy, with the ballot paper description 'Peace Coalition', was supported by Democratic Left, the Greens and some Labour groups.
Note 2: Kerr appeared on the ballot paper with the description Independence for Ulster.
Note 3: Mooney appeared on the ballot paper with the description Constitutional Independent Northern Ireland.

MEPs retiring

Conservative
Peter Beazley (Bedfordshire South)
Sir Fred Catherwood (Cambridge & Bedfordshire North)
Derek Prag (Hertfordshire)
Madron Seligman (Sussex West)

Labour
John Bird (Midlands West)
Janey Buchan (Glasgow)
Geoff Hoon (Derbyshire)

MEPs defeated

Labour
Henry McCubbin (North East Scotland)

Conservative
Christopher Beazley (Cornwall and Plymouth)
Nicholas Bethell, 4th Baron Bethell (London North West)
Margaret Daly (Somerset and North Devon)
Richard Fletcher-Vane, 2nd Baron Inglewood (Cumbria and Lancashire North)
Paul Howell (Norfolk)
Christopher Jackson (Kent East)
Bill Newton Dunn (Lincolnshire)
Ben Patterson (Kent West)
Peter Price (London South East)
Christopher Prout (Herefordshire and Shropshire)
Patricia Rawlings (Essex West and Hertfordshire East)
Anthony Simpson (Northamptonshire and Blaby)
Amédée Turner (Suffolk)
Michael Welsh (Central Lancashire)

See also

Elections in the United Kingdom: European elections
List of members of the European Parliament for the United Kingdom (1994–1999)

References

1994
European Parliament election
United Kingdom